The Roxburgh, Selkirk and Peebles by-election was significant in that it led to the election of David Steel, who went on to lead the Liberal Party, to the British House of Commons for the first time. As such it was a milestone in the revival of that party's political fortunes from their nadir in the 1950s.

Background
Roxburgh, Selkirk and Peebles, a large rural constituency in the Scottish borders, had been safely Conservative for many years. The Liberal Party's 26-year-old candidate David Steel had dramatically cut Commander Charles Donaldson's majority in the general election of October 1964. When Donaldson died some months later it was clear that the ensuing by-election represented an opportunity for the Liberals to repeat previous by-election triumphs in Torrington and Orpington. However, the Conservatives were now in opposition rather than in government and the party's standing in the constituency was thought to have been further bolstered as their leader, Sir Alec Douglas-Home was himself a Scot, representing the rather similar constituency of Kinross and West Perthshire to the north.

Result
The election was held on Wednesday 24 March 1965. The result was a major defeat for the Conservatives. The votes cast were as follows:

Reaction
This defeat was seen as a huge setback for the Conservatives, coming on top of their defeat in the general election the previous year and wiping out the boost they had received in the 1965 Leyton by-election. Douglas-Home resigned as leader shortly afterwards, and in the first election for party leader from amongst the Conservative MPs, was replaced by Edward Heath.

After his victory, Steel said that Douglas-Home was the only leading figure in the Conservatives who could  "take some comfort from the result" as he was the only one not to have come to the constituency to campaign in the by-election. The defeated Conservative candidate McEwen blamed his defeat on Labour voters switching to back the Liberals and predicted that the Liberal victory would be overturned at the next general election. In contrast Liberal MP for Caithness and Sutherland George Mackie described the result as "a triumph for David Steel" which showed that the "Liberal surge in Scotland" was continuing and predicted that the next general election would see the party make further gains in Scotland.

Although the Labour candidate lost his deposit, the governing party enjoyed the Conservatives' discomfort, and the result represented a turning point in the government's political fortunes after a very uncertain opening few months. For the Liberals, the acquisition of a talented young MP was still rare enough to be extremely welcome. Steel soon made a national impression and it was his Private Member's Bill which led to the legalisation of abortion in 1967. He would continue to represent the area at Westminster until 1997.

References

External links
Roxburgh, Selkirk and Peebles (UK Parliament constituency)
British Parliamentary By Elections: Campaign literature from the by-election

By-elections to the Parliament of the United Kingdom in Scottish constituencies
Roxburgh, Selkirk and Peebles by-election
1960s elections in Scotland
Roxburgh, Selkirk and Peebles by-election
Roxburgh, Selkirk and Peebles by-election